Leonard Robert Carr, Baron Carr of Hadley,  (11 November 1916 – 17 February 2012) was a British Conservative Party politician who served as Home Secretary from 1972 to 1974. He served as a Member of Parliament (MP) for 26 years, and later served in the House of Lords as a life peer.

Early life
Robert Carr was educated at Westminster School and Gonville and Caius College, Cambridge, where he read Natural Sciences, graduating in 1938. After graduation he applied his knowledge of metallurgy at John Dale & Co, the family metal engineering firm. A collapsed lung kept him from war service but his firm specialised in the construction of airframes for Lancaster bombers.

Political career
He was elected Member of Parliament for Mitcham in 1950 and served there until 1974, when the seat was merged and he moved to Carshalton.

In Edward Heath's government, he served as Secretary of State for Employment and was responsible for the modernising Industrial Relations Act 1971, which balanced the introduction of compensation for unfair dismissal with curbs on the freedom to strike and the virtual abolition of closed shop agreements. The Industrial Relations Act 1971 was deeply disliked by, trade unions, whose industrial action lead to the three-day week and ultimately to the defeat of the government. The victorious Labour Party promptly repealed the Industrial Relations Act and replaced it with the Trade Union and Labour Relations Act 1974, which scrapped the "offensive" provisions but effectively re-enacted the remainder of Carr's 1971 Act.

In 1971, Carr escaped injury when The Angry Brigade anarchist group exploded two bombs outside his house. More than thirty years later, a member of the group issued a public apology to Carr and sent him a Christmas card.

In 1972, Carr served a brief period as Lord President of the Council and then was appointed Home Secretary following the resignation of Reginald Maudling. Following Heath's defeat in the first ballot of the 1975 Conservative leadership contest, he  asked him to "take over the functions of leader" until a new leader was elected. The day after her election the new leader, Margaret Thatcher met with Carr, according to her at his request, before she formed shadow cabinet. According to her memoirs, Carr had been close to Heath and so she would have understood "if he did not relish the prospect of serving under" her. She stated that Carr made it clear that the only post that he would accept would be that of Shadow Foreign Secretary. She told him that she could not promise that and confided in her memoirs that at that stage, she was still considering appointments and was "not convinced" that she would offer Carr any role in the shadow cabinet. She proceeded to appoint Maudling as Shadow Foreign Secretary and saw Carr again later to inform him of her decision. In her memoirs, she speculated that Carr might have been "persuaded to stay in another capacity" but did not offer him the chance and noted, "I was not keen to have another strong opponent in any position on the team".

Later life
Carr was created a life peer as Baron Carr of Hadley, of Monken Hadley, North London, in 1976.

Death
Carr died 17 February 2012 at the age of 95 years. His body was buried in the graveyard of St. Peter's Church, in the Gloucestershire village  of Farmington. He was survived by his wife, Joan, and two daughters.

References

Bibliography

External links
 
 

1916 births
2012 deaths
Conservative Party (UK) MPs for English constituencies
Carr of Hadley
Parliamentary Private Secretaries to the Prime Minister
Lord Presidents of the Council
British Secretaries of State for Employment
Secretaries of State for the Home Department
Alumni of Gonville and Caius College, Cambridge
People educated at Westminster School, London
Presidents of Surrey County Cricket Club
Members of the Privy Council of the United Kingdom
UK MPs 1950–1951
UK MPs 1951–1955
UK MPs 1955–1959
UK MPs 1959–1964
UK MPs 1964–1966
UK MPs 1966–1970
UK MPs 1970–1974
UK MPs 1974
UK MPs 1974–1979
UK MPs who were granted peerages
Leaders of the House of Commons of the United Kingdom
Monken Hadley
Ministers in the Eden government, 1955–1957
Ministers in the Macmillan and Douglas-Home governments, 1957–1964
Shadow Chancellors of the Exchequer
Life peers created by Elizabeth II